Nebilyer Rural LLG is a local-level government (LLG) of Western Highlands Province, Papua New Guinea.

Wards
01. Pabarabuk
02. Papikola
03. Oamul
04. Kupeng
05. Kogmul
06. Malda
07. Teka 1
08. Teka 2
09. Kumbaia
10. Koibuka
11. Yumbiga 1
12. Yumbiga 2
13. Kaige 1
14. Kaige 2
15. Iriwaipa
16. Gomi
17. Tapia
18. Korkor
19. Paraka
20. Alimp 1
21. Alimp 2
22. Kumumbaga
23. Wagil
24. Agega
25. Olk
26. Koibuga
27. Pangatibuk
28. Dumakona
29. Kongra
30. Kend
31. Arowa
32. Wairipi
33. Keranum
34. Kongmul

References

Local-level governments of Western Highlands Province